Alexandre Barro Chambrier (born 25 August 1958) is a Gabonese politician and MP of the 4th district of Libreville, standing member of the political bureau and member of the Pan African Parliament.

Education
Mr. Alexandre Barro Chambrier holds an MA in  Economics and Management Science, Post Graduate Studies in Political Science (DEA) from the University of Paris IX Dauphine (France), Ph.D in Economics (Institut d’Etudes Politique, Paris, France) and a Post – Doctorate degree (Aggregation) in Economics From 1988–1991.

Early life and political career
He held successively responsibilities as the Economic Adviser to the Ministry of Trade and Secretary of State for Culture and Francophone within the Government of Gabon. From 1990 to 1994, he served as Senior Advisor to the Prime Minister of the Republic of Gabon.  In charge of the Special Committee on the Economic and Financial Crisis of the Republic of Gabon. Between 1994 and 2002 he served as the Alternate Director and Executive Director of the International Monetary Fund (IMF) in Washington, representing 24 African countries. From September 2004 – December 2005 he was the Deputy Minister in charge of Forestry, responsible for Nature Conservation, Deputy Minister in charge of Economy, Finances, Budget and Privatization (2006–2007), Minister Delegate to the Minister of Forest Economy, Water, Fisheries and Aquaculture, in charge of Water and Fisheries ( 2008–2009), Minister Delegate to the Minister of Development, Public Performance, Prospective and Statistics (2009). Since 14 January 2011 – February 2012, he served as the Minister of Mines, Petroleum and Hydrocarbons. He currently a member of the national parliament (4th District of Libreville) and a member of the Pan African Parliament (Midrand South Africa)

Publications
The Economy of Gabon: Analysis, adjustment and adaptation policies. From Hugues Alexandre Barro Chambrier.

References

1958 births
Gabonese Democratic Party politicians
Government ministers of Gabon
Living people
Members of the National Assembly of Gabon
21st-century Gabonese people